Herbert Henry Bennett (12 March 1885 – 20 January 1958) was an Australian rules footballer who played with Geelong in the Victorian Football League (VFL).

Notes

External links 

1885 births
1958 deaths
Australian rules footballers from Victoria (Australia)
Geelong Football Club players